Megastigma is a genus of flowering plants belonging to the family Rutaceae.

Its native range is Mexico to Central America.

Species:

Megastigma balsense 
Megastigma chiangii 
Megastigma galeottii 
Megastigma morenoi 
Megastigma skinneri

References

Zanthoxyloideae genera
Zanthoxyloideae